Columbus, Ohio has a humid continental (Köppen climate classification Dfa) climate, characterized by humid, hot summers and cold winters, with no dry season. The Dfa climate has average temperatures above 22 °C (72 °F) during the warmest months, with at least four months averaging above 10 °C (50 °F), and below 0 °C (32 °F) during the coldest. The climate is transitional with the Cfa humid subtropical climate to the south, characterized by humid, hot summers and cool winters (an average temperature above 0 °C (32 °F) but below 18 °C (64.4 °F) during the coldest months).

Columbus is within USDA hardiness zone 6a. Winter snowfall is relatively light, since the city is not in the typical path of strong winter lows, such as the Nor'easters that strike cities farther east. It is also too far south and west for lake-effect snow from Lake Erie to have much effect, although the lakes to the North contribute to long stretches of cloudy spells in winter.

Columbus is subject to severe weather typical to the Midwestern United States. Severe thunderstorms can bring lightning, large hail and on rare occasion tornadoes, especially during the spring and sometimes through fall.

Notes

References

Geography of Columbus, Ohio